Madeleine Lartessuti (1478–1543), also known as Magdeleine Lartessuti or Madeleine Lartessuti de Medicis, was a French shipper and banker. In Marseilles, she became one of the most well known female maritime traders of her time. 

Her father was the lawyer Pons Lartessuti, of Avignon, France, and her mother was Thore de Medicis (d.1490). She was married 31 January 1492 at about the age of twelve to a French aristocrat Joachim de Sade. 

In 1502, she left her husband in Avignon and settled in Marseilles, where she engaged in sea maritime trade with North Africa, Italy, and Egypt. She was also involved in finance and became a nationally powerful banker of the king. She financed ships for King Francis I of France, and provided loans and supplies for Bertrand d'Ornesan, Baron de Saint-Blancart, Vice Admiral of the East Mediterranean Fleet, who was reportedly also her lover. On 19 March 1539 d'Ornesan died. 

Lartessuti also provided a ship of her own to the Royal Navy.  

After the death of her estranged spouse in 1540, she negotiated the help of the Pope to recover her dowry.

References

1479 births
1543 deaths
French bankers
16th-century French businesswomen
Ship owners
History of Marseille
Businesspeople from Marseille